Amphi may refer to:
 Amphi Festival, a German music festival
 Amphitheater Public Schools
 Naphthalene substitution patterns, two substituents that occupy positions 2 and 6 either 3 and 7 on a naphthalene condensed rings